A six shooter is a type of revolver that carries six cartridges

Six Shooter or Sixshooter may also refer to:
 Six Shooter (film), a 2005 Academy Award-winning live action short film
 The Six Shooter, a 1953–1954 radio series starring Jimmy Stewart
 Six Shooter Records, a record label
 "Six Shooter", a song by Queens of the Stone Age from the album Songs for the Deaf
 a variety of maize which averages six ears per stalk and is frequently grown as a novelty
 Sixshooter, Texas, an unincorporated area in Pecos County
 Sixshooter Peaks, summits in Utah

See also
Six gun (disambiguation)
 Sixshot, a character from the Transformers franchise